Rahimabad (also Romanized as Raḩīmābād) is a village in Qaleh Hamam Rural District, Salehabad County, Razavi Khorasan Province, Iran. At the 2006 census, its population was 76, in 16 families.

References 

Populated places in   Torbat-e Jam County